"If You Ever Stop Loving Me" is a song by Bob DiPiero, Rivers Rutherford and Tom Shapiro and recorded by American country music duo Montgomery Gentry.  It was released in February 2004 as the first single to the duo's 2004 album You Do Your Thing. The song became their first number one single on the US Billboard Hot Country Songs charts.  It also was their biggest crossover hit on the Billboard Hot 100, where it reached number 30.

Content
The narrator is a man who experienced tough experiences in life, but as long as his significant other stays with him he can handle anything.

Critical reception
Billboard magazine reviewed the song favorably saying that Gentry delivers a "solid performance that is full of personality." The production was reviewed as "an edgy, groove-laden framework, punctuating the duo's gutsy performance with crunchy guitars and driving production."

Music video
The music video was directed by Trey Fanjoy and premiered in early 2004.

Chart positions
"If You Ever Stop Loving Me" debuted at number 58 on the U.S. Billboard Hot Country Singles & Tracks for the week of February 7, 2004.

Year-end charts

References

2004 singles
Montgomery Gentry songs
Songs written by Bob DiPiero
Songs written by Tom Shapiro
Songs written by Rivers Rutherford
Music videos directed by Trey Fanjoy
Columbia Nashville Records singles
2004 songs